The Girl with the Bruise is a 1933 German-Italian comedy film directed by E. W. Emo and starring Hilda Springher, Sergio Tofano, and Renato Cialente. It is the Italian-language version of the German film And Who Is Kissing Me?.

Cast

References

Bibliography

External links 
 

1933 films
Films of the Weimar Republic
Italian comedy films
German comedy films
1933 comedy films
1930s Italian-language films
Films directed by E. W. Emo
Italian multilingual films
German black-and-white films
Italian black-and-white films
German multilingual films
1933 multilingual films
1930s Italian films
1930s German films